The  is a Baptist Christian denomination in Japan. It is affiliated with the Baptist World Alliance. The headquarters is in Saitama.

History
The Convention has its origins in an American mission of the International Mission Board in southwestern Japan in 1889.  It was officially founded in 1947.  According to a denomination census released in 2022, it claimed 320 churches and 13,975 members.

References

Bibliography
The Southern Baptist Mission in Japan, 1889-1989, by F. Calvin Parker (University Press of America, 1991)

External links
Japan Baptist Convention Official Page, in Japanese
Japan Baptist Convention Disaster Relief Web-Blog , in English

Baptist denominations in Asia
Baptist Christianity in Japan